This is a list of World Heritage Sites in Israel with properties of cultural and natural heritage as inscribed in UNESCO's World Heritage List or on the country's tentative list.

The list includes ten sites within the State of Israel.

World Heritage Sites 

Site; named after the World Heritage Committee's official designation
Location; at city, regional, or provincial level and geocoordinates
Criteria; as defined by the World Heritage Committee
Area; in hectares and acres. If available, the size of the buffer zone has been noted as well. A value of zero implies that no data has been published by UNESCO
Year; during which the site was inscribed to the World Heritage List
Description; brief information about the site, including reasons for qualifying as an endangered site, if applicable

World Heritage Sites located in Israel

List of properties in the tentative list
In addition to sites inscribed on the World Heritage List, member states can maintain a list of tentative sites that they may consider for nomination. Nominations for the World Heritage List are only accepted if the site was previously listed on the tentative list. , Israel recorded 18 sites on its tentative list. The sites, along with the year they were included on the tentative list are:

See also
Tourism in Israel
List of World Heritage Sites in Western Asia

References

External links
 UNESCO World Heritage Centre – Israel

Israel
World Heritage Sites